Atrazonotus is a genus of dirt-colored seed bugs in the family Rhyparochromidae. There is one described species in Atrazonotus, A. umbrosus.

References

Rhyparochromidae
Articles created by Qbugbot
Pentatomomorpha genera
Monotypic Hemiptera genera